Sir Frederick Fergus Graham, 5th Baronet KBE TD (10 March 1893 – 1 August 1978) was a Conservative Party politician in the United Kingdom.

Early life
Graham was a "member of one of the most distinguished Border families". He was the son of Sir Richard James Graham, 4th Baronet, and Lady Mabel Cynthia Duncombe, who were first cousins. His younger siblings included Richard Graham-Vivian (who married Audrey Emily Vivian, daughter of Maj. Henry Wyndham Vivian) and Daphne Graham (who married Sir Kenneth Barnes).

His maternal grandparents were William Duncombe, 1st Earl of Feversham and Mabel Violet Graham. His paternal grandparents were Sir Frederick Graham, 3rd Baronet and Lady Jane Hermione Stewart (a daughter of Edward Seymour, 12th Duke of Somerset). His paternal grandfather and maternal grandmother were siblings, both children of the prominent British statesman Sir James Graham, 2nd Baronet, who served as First Lord of the Admiralty and Home Secretary.

He was educated at Eton College and Christ Church, Oxford.

Career
Graham served from 1914 to 1918 during the Great War as Captain of the Irish Guards, where he was severely wounded, and mentioned in despatches, "leading a charge at Givenchy in February, 1915." After he recovery, he served as aide-de-camp to his father-in-law, Gen. Reade and, later, to Gen. Fielding. "After the War he returned to Oxford and took a course in agriculture" and became a tenant farmer in North Cumberland.

He was first elected to the House of Commons at a by-election in 1926 in the North Cumberland constituency. The sitting Conservative Member of Parliament (MP) Donald Howard had succeeded to the peerage as Baron Strathcona and Mount Royal, and Graham held the seat comfortably. He represented the constituency for nine years, until his defeat at the 1935 general election by the Liberal candidate Wilfrid Roberts.

Graham returned to Parliament at the 1951 general election, when he was elected as MP for Darlington, defeating the sitting Labour MP David Hardman. Graham held his seat until he retired at the 1959 general election.

In 1932, he succeeded his father to the baronetcy, becoming the 5th Baronet Graham, of Netherby. He was Lord Lieutenant of Cumberland from 1958 to 1968. During the 1930s Graham's wife supported the local branch of the NSPCC.

Personal life
In 1918 he married Mary Spencer Revell Reade, the only child of Major-General Raymond Northland Revell Reade and Rose Frances Spence. They had two children, one son and one daughter:

 Major Sir Charles Spencer Richard Graham, 6th Baronet (1919–1997), who married Isabel Susan Anne Surtees, daughter of Maj. Robert Lambton Surtees.
 Cynthia Mary Graham (1923–1927), who died young.

Sir Fergus died on 1 August 1978 and was succeeded in the baronetcy by his only son Charles.

References

Specific

External links 
 

1893 births
1978 deaths
People educated at Eton College
People educated at Summer Fields School
Alumni of Christ Church, Oxford
Graham, Fergus, 5th Baronet
Conservative Party (UK) MPs for English constituencies
Lord-Lieutenants of Cumberland
UK MPs 1924–1929
UK MPs 1929–1931
UK MPs 1931–1935
UK MPs 1951–1955
UK MPs 1955–1959